Leandro Martínez may refer to:

 Leandro Antonio Martínez (born 1989), Argentine-Italian football forward
 Leandro Emmanuel Martínez  (born 1994), Argentine football striker
 Leandro Martínez Montagnoli (born 1987), Argentine footballer
 Leandro Martínez (baseball) (born 1978), Cuban baseball pitcher